Haliotis kamtschatkana, common name the northern abalone or pinto abalone, is a species of large sea snail, a marine gastropod mollusc in the family Haliotidae, the abalones.

It has been listed as "Endangered" by the IUCN Red List of Endangered Species since 2006.

Taxonomy
Haliotis kamtschatkana has two subspecies:
 Haliotis kamtschatkana assimilis Dall, 1878
 Haliotis kamtschatkana kamtschatkana Jonas, 1845

Description
The rather thin shell is flattened and ear-shaped. The surface is covered with uneven spiral cords, often almost obsolete, and strongly elevated undulations or lumps. The columellar shelf is narrow, flattened, and sloping inward. The shell has 3 to 6 elevated respiratory holes. These holes collectively make up what is known as the selenizone which form as the shell grows. The silvery interior of the shell is iridescent. The shell is generally green-brown but can have white or blue coloration and has a somewhat scalloped edge. The epipodium is lacy and green-brown in color. Tentacles surrounding the foot and extending out of the shell sense food and predators.

Distribution
Pinto abalone are found in kelp beds and in rocky areas in the northeast Pacific Ocean, where they range from Salisbury Sound, Alaska, along the coasts of Canada and contiguous United States to Baja California, Mexico. This is the Pacific abalone species with the widest latitudinal distribution in North America.

The distribution of this species also includes Korea.

Status by location
In California, Pinto abalone were never a major component of recreational or commercial catch. There was however a 10-fold decline in abundance in northern California. (156,000 in 1971 to 18,000 in 1999-2001)

In Alaska, peak harvest was between 1978 and 1981 (260,000 lbs); average harvest declined to 50,000 lbs in 1994. The commercial fishery was closed in 1996; recreational free-diving fishery remains.

In Washington State, there was no historical commercial fishing; the recreational fishing closed in 1994 due to declines in abundance. Surveys in the San Juan Islands indicate a decline in density at many sites. Densities at all but one site are below or within the minimum range for successful fertilization. Abalone size has increased between 1996 and 2006 but abundance has not.

In Canada, the fishery began in the early 1970s and the peak fishery was in 1977-1978 (400t). Subsequently, there was a population decline and quotas were instituted. As populations did not recover there were continuing quota reductions through 1989 (47.2t) without population response. The fishery was closed in 1990 to all user groups but since the closure, the population decline has continued.

Habitat
This species lives on rocky shores. These abalones are found intertidally or subtidally near kelp to 30 feet (9 m) depth, but they can be found to 330 feet (100 m) depth. Like all abalones, they are herbivorous.

Reproduction
They broadcast spawn from April to June.  Larval dispersal is limited.  Lifespan is about 15 years.

Conservation
Population size has declined due to overharvesting, illegal harvesting, predation by recovering sea otters, and disease.  Because of concerns about its status the Northern Abalone is a U.S. National Marine Fisheries Service Species of Concern.  Species of Concern are those species about which the U.S. Government's National Oceanic and Atmospheric Administration, National Marine Fisheries Service (NMFS), has some concerns regarding status and threats, but for which insufficient information has been available to indicate a need to list the species under the U.S. Endangered Species Act.  The species is called pinto abalone by NMFS.  The National Marine Fisheries Service announced in November 2013 that it will conduct a status review for the pinto abalone.  The Natural Resources Defense Council and the Center for Biological Diversity filed petitions over the summer calling for a status review that could lead to added protections for the species. The Center for Biological Diversity filed its petition August 1, 2013. On December 29, 2014, NMFS announced its finding that the pinto abalone was not warranted for listing.<ref name=NMFS>NMFS. Endangered and Threatened Wildlife and Plants; Notice of 12-Month Finding on Petitions To List the Pinto Abalone as Threatened or Endangered Under the Endangered Species Act (ESA).Federal Register;; v78, (December 29, 2014), 77998-78022.</ref>

This species is now endangered according to the International Union for Conservation of Nature, mainly due to uncontrolled harvesting and poaching of the species for food.  The state of Washington never permitted commercial harvest and recreation take was outlawed in 1994.  Alaska outlawed commercial harvest in 1996.

Harvest has been illegal in Canada since 1990.  The Committee on the Status of Endangered Wildlife in Canada (COSEWIC) has listed it as an endangered species. The Canadian Species at Risk Act listed it in the List of Wildlife Species at Risk as being endangered in Canada.

Factors for decline include: over harvest, illegal, unregulated, unreported harvest, predation by the recovering sea otter population, and disease.

References

Resources
 Rosenberg, G. 1992. Encyclopedia of Seashells. Dorset: New York. 224 pp.
 Turgeon, D.D., et al. 1998. Common and scientific names of aquatic invertebrates of the United States and Canada. American Fisheries Society Special Publication 26 page(s): 57
 Geiger D.L. & Poppe G.T. (2000). A Conchological Iconography: The family Haliotidae. Conchbooks, Hackenheim Germany. 135pp 83pls.
 Geiger D.L. & Owen B. (2012) Abalone: Worldwide Haliotidae''. Hackenheim: Conchbooks. viii + 361 pp.

External links
  
 
 
 
 

kamtschatkana
Gastropods described in 1845
Taxonomy articles created by Polbot